Khardan-e Do (also Romanized as Khārdān-e Do; also known as Khārdūn) is a village in Kuh Panj Rural District, in the Central District of Bardsir County, Kerman Province, Iran. At the 2006 census, its population was 21, in 5 families.

References 

Populated places in Bardsir County